Lithium aluminate, also called lithium aluminium oxide, is an inorganic chemical compound, an aluminate of lithium.  In microelectronics, lithium aluminate is considered as a lattice matching substrate for gallium nitride. In nuclear technology, lithium aluminate is of interest as a solid tritium breeder material, for preparing tritium fuel for nuclear fusion.

Lithium aluminate is a layered double hydroxide (LDH) with a crystal structure resembling that of hydrotalcite. Lithium aluminate solubility at high pH (12.5 – 13.5) is much lower than that of aluminium oxides. In the conditioning of low- and intermediate level radioactive waste (LILW), lithium nitrate is sometimes used as additive to cement to minimise aluminium corrosion at high pH and subsequent hydrogen production. Indeed, upon addition of lithium nitrate to cement, a passive layer of  · 5  is formed onto the surface of metallic aluminium waste immobilised in mortar. The lithium aluminate layer is insoluble in cement pore water and protects the underlying aluminium oxide covering the metallic aluminium from dissolution at high pH. It is also a pore filler. This hinders the aluminium oxidation by the protons of water and reduces the hydrogen evolution rate by a factor of 10.

Lithium aluminate also finds its use as an inert electrolyte support material in molten carbonate fuel cells, where the electrolyte may be a mixture of lithium carbonate, potassium carbonate, and sodium carbonate.

History
In 1906 Weyberg described his newly synthesized compound, lithium hydrogen aluminate. This was the first known synthesis of this unique compound. He asserted that this new compound had the corresponding chemical formula:

 
      
In 1915 Allen and Rogers asserted that an insoluble aluminate of lithium is formed when aluminum is dissolved in a solution of lithium hydroxide. This air-dried substance had an atomic ratio of 2Li:5Al and the chemical formula:

 

In 1929 Prociv recreated Allen and Rogers experiment and through a series of conductometric measurements on the saturated solution of the substance concluded that lithium and aluminum were present in the ratio of 0.8Li:2Al, which, he says, is an atomic ratio of approximately 1Li:2Al. According to him lithium aluminate may also be precipitated by the addition of a solution of lithium hydroxide to a solution of aluminum salt or by adding a solution of lithium salt to a solution of an alkali aluminate. Thus there was disagreement between Allen/Rogers and Prociv as to the composition of lithium aluminate. This may have been attributed to variations between their precipitation conditions.

In 1932 Dobbins and Sanders described the formation of lithium aluminate by the addition of dilute ammonia to a solution containing lithium and aluminum salt, in the presence of phelphtalein as an indicator. In their preparation of acid lithium aluminate they dissolved strips of amalgamated aluminum in normal and tenth normal solutions of lithium hydroxide. The lithium aluminate was precipitated by the addition of a solution of lithium hydroxide to a solution of aluminum salts, or by adding a solution of lithium salt to a solution of alkaline aluminate. In all cases the composition of the compound of lithium aluminate was expressed by the formula:

 

They claimed that the formed compound contained lithium and aluminum in the atomic ratio of 2Li:5Al. Their chemical formula was simplified into the modern formulation for lithium aluminate:

Fields of interest
The fundamental compound of lithium aluminate has found attention in two different fields: nuclear physics and solid-state chemistry. At least five different phases of lithium aluminate have been found. The lithium aluminate crystal structure may be found in either α, β, or γ phases.

Nuclear physicists are interested in the   modification of lithium aluminate, because of its good performance under high neutron and electron radiation. This modification also exhibits the essential chemical, thermo physical and mechanical stability at high temperature along with the required irradiation behavior.   This phase appears to be a promising lithium ceramic, suitable as an in site tritium breeding material in future fusion reactors.

Solid-state chemists investigating preparational routes to lithium aluminate discovered its interesting acid-base chemistry.

Formation

Early methods

Current methods
Synthesis of lithium aluminate has been essentially performed by several methods: in the solid state, by wet chemical, sol-gel, with the use of templates, various precursors, and combustion processes. The α-LiAlO2 modification (low temperature phase), with a hexagonal structure, undergoes transformation to the γ-modification (High temperature phase), with a tetragonal structure, at about 900 °C. The metastable β-modification, with a monoclinic structure, is assumed to transform to the γ-modification at about 900 °C.

Natural occurrence
The compound is unknown in the natural environment. However, a related compound, LiAl5O8, is known as the very recently discovered (as of 2020) and very rare mineral chukochenite.

References

Aluminates
Lithium compounds